This is a list of the highest paved roads in Europe. This height approximately corresponds to that of the highest settlements in Europe and to the tree line in several mountain ranges such as the Alps and the Pyrenees, where most of the highest roads are located.

Some of the listed roads are closed to motorized vehicles, although they are normally all accessible to pedestrians and cyclists. These mountain roads are visited by drivers, motorcyclists, bicyclists and hikers for their scenery and often feature in the routes of European bicycle races such as the Giro d'Italia, the Tour de Suisse, the Tour of Austria, the Tour de France and the Vuelta a España. Due to snow conditions, most of the high roads are closed between (late) autumn and late spring/early summer.

Note on the elevations: Near the highest point of the road there is often a shield that indicates the name (in local language) and the elevation of the pass/hill/summit. The shield may, though, indicate a wrong elevation, being usually some old measurement. Also, popular navigation devices may present inaccurate elevations.

Below the list of highest roads is a list of the highest motorways (controlled-access highways) in Europe.

Highest paved roads

Highest controlled-access highways

See also 
 Extreme points of Europe
 List of highest paved roads in Europe by country
 List of the highest roads in Scotland
 List of highest paved roads in Switzerland
 List of highest points reached in the Tour de France
 List of highest railways in Europe
 List of mountain passes
 Principal passes of the Alps
 Transport in Europe
 Gobba di Rollin - highest location in Europe reached by 4x4 vehicles

References

External links

 World Atlas - Highest and Lowest Points
 Map of Spain, provided by the Spanish IGN, Instituto Geográfico Nacional
 Map of Catalonia, provided by Institut Cartogràfic i Geològic de Catalunya
 Map of Switzerland
 ViaMichelin online road map
 10 Most Beautiful Road Climbs in Europe (September 25, 2013)
 A Compendium of High Roads and Road Passes in Great Britain

List of highest roads
Paved roads
Highest paved roads
Europe Highest Paved
Transport-related lists of superlatives
Highest things